Bowery Bombshell is a 1946 film starring the comedy team of The Bowery Boys.  It is the third film in the series.

Plot
Sweet Shop owner Louie needs to raise $300.  The Boys try to sell their jalopy to raise the money, but are unable to because the car falls apart when they try to show it to a prospective buyer.  They decide to go to the bank and take a loan out on it, but just as they arrive the bank is robbed.  The robbers bump into them and drop the bag full of the stolen money.  As Sach picks up the bag to return it to the robber, Cathy, a photographer, takes his photo.

After trying unsuccessfully to get the photo back, it winds up on the front page of the newspaper and Sach becomes a wanted criminal.  Slip pretends to be a notorious gangster, Midge Casalotti, in order to get the stolen money back and to clear Sach's name.  In the end, Sach is cleared and the gangsters, led by Ace Deuce, are apprehended.

The film ends in an explosion, where a spare tire with the words, "Dead End" on it falls around the necks of Sach and Slip.

Cast

The Bowery Boys
 Leo Gorcey as Terrance 'Slip' Mahoney
 Huntz Hall as Sach
 Bobby Jordan as Bobby
 William Benedict as Whitey
 David Gorcey as Chuck

Remaining cast
 Bernard Gorcey as Louie Dumbrowski
 Teala Loring as Cathy Smith
 Sheldon Leonard as Ace Deuce
 Wee Willie Davis as Moose
 James Burke as Officer O'Malley
 William Ruhl as Biff
 Lester Dorr as Feather Fingers

Notes
First Bowery Boys film with former East Side Kid Buddy Gorman. He only has a small cameo as 'Bud' (the newsboy), but would become a regular member of the gang beginning with the film Blonde Dynamite.

Home media
Warner Archives released the film on made-to-order DVD in the United States as part of "The Bowery Boys, Volume One" on November 23, 2012.

References

External links 
 
 
 
 

1946 films
Bowery Boys films
Monogram Pictures films
Films directed by Phil Karlson
American comedy films
1946 comedy films
American black-and-white films
1940s English-language films
1940s American films